is a railway station on the Takayama Main Line in the city of Gero,  Gifu Prefecture, Japan, operated by Central Japan Railway Company (JR Central).

Lines

Station layout
Hida-Osaka Station has one ground-level island platform connected to the station building by a level crossing. The station is unattended.

Platforms

Adjacent stations

History
Hida-Osaka Station opened on August 25, 1933. The station was absorbed into the JR Central network upon the privatization of Japanese National Railways (JNR) on April 1, 1987.

Surrounding area
 
Hida River

See also

 List of Railway Stations in Japan

Railway stations in Gifu Prefecture
Takayama Main Line
Railway stations in Japan opened in 1933
Stations of Central Japan Railway Company
Gero, Gifu